Ulbroka is a village in Stopiņi Parish, Ropaži Municipality in the Vidzeme region of Latvia. It is the administrative center of Stopiņi Parishand municipality. The village is crossed by two first category roads Rīga-Ērgļi (P4) and Rīga-Ogre (P5).

In 2000 Ulbroka had 2,701 inhabitants, rising to 3,102 in 2021.

Etymology 
The name Ulbroka comes from the burgomaster of Riga Hinrich von Ulenbrock II in the second half of the 16th century. Von Ulenbrock built the Ulbroka manor.

Geography 
The village is located in the Central Latvian lowlands, near Riga. The river flowing through Ulbroka - Piķurga was artificially expanded, creating the Lake of Ulbroka, once excavated as a large pond of manor, and then a mill lake. The Dauguļupīte stream flows into Piķurga in the north of the village.

The average temperature is -6 ° C in January and + 17 ° C in July. Precipitation drops 700 mm per year.

Economy 
The largest company registered in Ulbroka in terms of turnover in 2020 was the manufacturer of wooden packaging SIA "Kronus".

Next to Ulbroka is a medium-wave radio station.

The Riga city buses (Nr. 51) run to Ulbroka.

Images

References 

Towns and villages in Latvia
Ropaži Municipality
Kreis Riga
Vidzeme